Valik Rudposht (also Romanized as Valīk Rūdposht) is a village in Khoshk Rud Rural District, Rudbast District, Babolsar County, Mazandaran Province, Iran. At the 2006 census, its population was 477, in 113 families.

References 

Populated places in Babolsar County